Eula Biss (born 1977) is an American non-fiction writer who is the author of four books.

Biss has won the Carl Sandburg Literary Award, the Rona Jaffe Foundation Writers' Award, the Graywolf Press Nonfiction Prize, the Pushcart Prize, and the National Book Critics Circle Award. She is a founding editor of Essay Press and a Guggenheim Fellow.

Life and career
After earning a bachelor's degree in non-fiction writing from Hampshire College, Biss moved to New York City, San Diego, and then Iowa City, where she went on to complete her MFA in the University of Iowa's Nonfiction Writing Program.

Biss taught writing at Northwestern University for fifteen years, from 2006-2021. She is the author of four books and the founder of Essay Press. Her second book, Notes from No Man's Land, won the Graywolf Press Nonfiction Prize, and in March 2010, the National Book Critics Circle Award in the criticism category. Her third book, On Immunity: An Inoculation, was one of the New York Times Book Review'''s 10 Best Books of 2014 and was a finalist for the 2014 National Book Critics Circle Award (Criticism).

Biss lives outside Chicago. She is married to the writer John Bresland, and they have a son.

WorksThe Balloonists, Hanging Loose Press, 2002, Notes from No Man's Land, Graywolf Press, 2009, On Immunity: An Inoculation, Graywolf Press, 2014, Having and Being Had, Riverhead Books, 2020, 

References

External links
Author's website
 Radio Interview: Eula Biss discusses her book On Immunity, public health and anti-vaccination movements on The 7th Avenue Project radio show.
 Radio interview: Eula Biss is interviewed about race and "Whiteness" by host Krista Tippett on On Being
The "F-Word": Fragment and the Futility of Genre Classification: a Roundtable Discussion with Eula Biss, Sarah Manguso, Maggie Nelson, and Allie Rowbottom in Gulf Coast: A Journal of Literature and Fine Arts'' (25.1)
Book TV: Eula Biss "Notes From No Man's Land"

1977 births
Living people
American non-fiction writers
Hampshire College alumni
University of Iowa alumni
Northwestern University faculty
Rona Jaffe Foundation Writers' Award winners
21st-century American women writers
21st-century American essayists
American women essayists
American women academics